Nikolai Zhilyayev may refer to:
 Nikolai Zhilyayev (musicologist) (1881–1938), Russian musicologist
 Nikolai Zhilyayev (footballer) (born 1987), Russian soccer player